Illusion is a 1967 Croatian film directed by Krsto Papić.

External links

1967 films
1960s Croatian-language films
Films directed by Krsto Papić
Jadran Film films
Croatian drama films
Films set in Zagreb
1967 directorial debut films
1967 drama films
Yugoslav drama films